The 42nd congressional district of New York was a congressional district for the United States House of Representatives in New York. It was created in 1913 as a result of the 1910 Census. It was eliminated as a result of the 1960 Census. It was last represented by John R. Pillion, who was redistricted into the 39th District.

List of members representing the district

Election results
The following chart shows historic election results. Bold type indicates victor. Italic type indicates incumbent.

References 

 Congressional Biographical Directory of the United States 1774–present
 Election Statistics 1920-present Clerk of the House of Representatives

42
Former congressional districts of the United States
1913 establishments in New York (state)
1963 disestablishments in New York (state)
Constituencies established in 1913
Constituencies disestablished in 1963